Jossie Nikita Marques Spear is a Venezuelan model, born in Maracaibo, Edo. Zulia and titleholder of the Miss Mundo Latina,  who will compete in Miss Venezuela. Her heritage is mixed from Venezuelan, Portuguese, American, and French. She speaks English, Spanish, and Portuguese. Jossie is currently pursuing her bachelor's degree in Fine Arts for Theater at the University of Central Florida.

Jossie is cousin of Mónica Spear, who also won the Miss Venezuela 2004 and placed fourth runner up in the Miss Universe in 2005.

References

External links 
 
 Miss Venezuela La Nueva Era MB

1989 births
Living people
People from Maracaibo
Venezuelan female models
Venezuelan beauty pageant winners